The Australian Department of Education, Skills and Employment (DESE) was a department of the Government of Australia, existing between 1 February 2020 to 1 July 2022 from a merger of the Department of Education (2019–2020) and Department of Employment, Skills, Small and Family Business. It was superseded by the Department of Education and Department of Employment and Workplace Relations.

The department "works to ensure Australians can experience the wellbeing and economic benefits that quality education, skills and employment provide." Its primary focus was "to equip Australians — at all life and career stages — with knowledge, skills and attributes to live well, thrive at work and contribute to community life."

The head of the department was the Secretary of DESE, at dissolution Dr Michele Bruniges AM, who reported to the Minister for Education, at dissolution the Hon. Jason Clare MP; the Minister for Employment, at dissolution the Hon. Tony Burke MP; and the Minister for Skills and Training, at dissolution the Hon. Brendan O'Connor MP.

History
The department was formed by way of an Administrative Arrangements Order issued on 5 December 2019, effective from 1 February 2020. It was merged from the:
Department of Education
Department of Employment, Skills, Small and Family Business (except small business functions)

Preceding departments
The DESE's predecessor education departments have been:
 Department of Education and Science (13 December 1966 – 19 December 1972)
 Department of Education (19 December 1972 – 11 March 1983)
 Department of Education and Youth Affairs (11 March 1983 – 13 December 1984)
 Department of Education (13 December 1984 – 24 July 1987)
 Department of Employment, Education and Training (DEET) (24 July 1987 – 11 March 1996)
 Department of Employment, Education, Training and Youth Affairs (DEETYA) (11 March 1996 – 21 October 1998)
 Department of Education, Training and Youth Affairs (DETYA) (21 October 1998 – 26 November 2001)
 Department of Education, Science and Training (DEST) (26 November 2001 – 3 December 2007)
 Department of Education, Employment and Workplace Relations (DEEWR) (3 December 2007 – 18 September 2013)
 Department of Education (18 September 2013 – 23 December 2014)
 Department of Education and Training (23 December 2014 – 29 May 2019)
 Department of Education (29 May 2019 – 1 February 2020)

The DESE's predecessor employment departments have been:
Department of Labor and Immigration (12 June 1974 – 22 December 1975)
Department of Employment and Industrial Relations (22 December 1975 – 5 December 1978)
Department of Employment and Youth Affairs (5 December 1978 – 7 May 1982)
Department of Employment and Industrial Relations (7 May 1982 – 24 July 1987)
Department of Employment, Education and Training (24 July 1987 – 11 March 1996)
Department of Employment, Education, Training and Youth Affairs (11 March 1996 – 21 October 1998)
Department of Employment, Workplace Relations and Small Business (21 October 1998 – 26 November 2001)
Department of Employment and Workplace Relations (26 November 2001 – 3 December 2007)
Department of Education, Employment and Workplace Relations (3 December 2007 – 18 September 2013)
Department of Employment (18 September 2013 - 20 December 2017)
 Department of Jobs and Small Business (20 December 2017 – 29 May 2019)
 Department of Employment, Skills, Small and Family Business (29 May 2019 – 1 February 2020)

Operational activities
The functions of the department were broadly classified into the following matters:
Employment policy, including employment services
Jobactive
Labour market programmes for people of working age
Co-ordination of labour market research
Equal employment opportunity
Work and family programmes
Participation, activity test and compliance policy for participation payment recipients
Reducing the burden of government regulation
Skills and vocational education policy regulation and programmes, including vocational education and training in schools
Training, including apprenticeships and training and skills assessment services
Training transitions policy and programmes
Foundation skills for adults
Schools education policy and programmes
Education transitions policy and programmes
Pre-school education policy and programmes
Higher education policy, regulation and programmes
Policy, coordination and support for international education and research engagement
Co-ordination of research policy in relation to universities
Creation and development of research infrastructure
Research grants and fellowships
Childcare policy and programmes
Co-ordination of early childhood development policy and responsibilities

See also

 Minister for Education (Australia)
 List of Australian Commonwealth Government entities
 Education in Australia

References

External links
 Department of Education, Skills and Employment
 Australian Institute for Teaching and School Leadership Website

2020 establishments in Australia
2022 disestablishments in Australia
Education
Education policy in Australia
Australia
Australia, Education
Public policy in Australia